The Ruf RK Coupe and RK Spyder are mid-engine sports cars made by Ruf Automobile in collaboration with Italian design house Studiotorino. The RK Spyder was introduced in 2005 in Turin and the RK Coupe was introduced the following year in 2006 in California.

Development and production

The RK is a result of a collaboration between German automaker Ruf and Italian carozzeria Studiotorino, the RK Coupe and Spyder are based on the Porsche 987 Cayman and Boxster. The carrozzeria consulted with Aldo Brovarone on the designs, with the RK taking cues from the Ferrari Dino 246 GT, the Porsche 550, and the Porsche 904. 

Both the Coupe and Spyder feature revised bodywork by Studiotorino, including redesigned front and rear fascias, redesigned vents afront the rear wheels, integrated door handles with electronic door latches, forged aluminum exhaust and filler cap, custom wheels.  Revisions to the Coupe include a redesigned roofline removing the rear quarter windows and adding a new rear hatch to replace the sloping rear glass with a smaller upright piece and adding "flying" buttresses based on the existing pillars.

Initially, 49 RK Coupes and 49 RK Spyders were to be produced. However, according to Studiotorino, only three RK Spyders, two RK Coupes, and one R Spyder, a naturally-aspirated variant of the RK Spyder, were produced between 2005 and 2007.

Performance

The RK Coupe, the better performer of the two, has a top speed of 314 km/h (190 mph), and can accelerate from 0-100 km/h (62 mph) in 4.1 seconds and from 0-97 km/h (60 mph) in 3.8 seconds. 

References

External links 

Autoblog.com
Road and Track

Coupés
Ruf vehicles
Sports cars
Cars powered by boxer engines
Rear mid-engine, rear-wheel-drive vehicles
Cars introduced in 2005
Cars introduced in 2006